Musical Mountaineers is a 1939 Fleischer Studios animated short film starring Betty Boop.

Synopsis
Betty Boop's automobile runs out of gasoline while driving through hillbilly country. When she goes up to a nearby shack to ask for help, landowner Zonk Peters and his family are suspicious of the stranger, mistaking her for an attacking Hatfield, but Betty wins them with her dancing. Soon, the entire Peters clan are making music and dancing. Betty's new friends help her on her way by filling her gas tank with a jug of "corn dripp'ns".

References

External links
 Musical Mountaineers on Youtube.
 Musical Mountaineers at the Big Cartoon Database.

1939 short films
Betty Boop cartoons
1930s American animated films
American black-and-white films
Paramount Pictures short films
1939 animated films
Short films directed by Dave Fleischer
Fleischer Studios short films
1930s English-language films
American animated short films
Films about feuds